Hanley Falls is a city in Yellow Medicine County, Minnesota, United States. The population was 304 at the 2010 census.

History
Hanley Falls was laid out in 1884 when the Minneapolis and St. Louis Railway was extended to that point. The city was named after a railroad official. A post office has been in operation at Hanley Falls since 1887. Hanley Falls was incorporated in 1892.

Geography

The Yellow Medicine River flows through the city.

Minnesota State Highway 23 serves as a main route in the community.

Two railroad lines intersect on the northwest side of town; the question of whether the state of Minnesota could order installation of an interchange track between the two independent railroads led to a 1900 U.S. Supreme Court decision which affirmed that the state could indeed order the establishment of the "Hanley Falls Wye" for the public convenience, despite the railroads' opposition.

Demographics

2010 census
As of the census of 2010, there were 304 people, 107 households, and 74 families residing in the city. The racial makeup of the city was 92.8% White, 0.3% African American, 1.3% Native American, 1.3% Pacific Islander, 3.6% from other races, and 0.7% from two or more races. Hispanic or Latino of any race were 28.9% of the population.

There were 107 households, of which 45.8% had children under the age of 18 living with them, 55.1% were married couples living together, 12.1% had a female householder with no husband present, 1.9% had a male householder with no wife present, and 30.8% were non-families. 27.1% of all households were made up of individuals, and 7.5% had someone living alone who was 65 years of age or older. The average household size was 2.84 and the average family size was 3.51.

The median age in the city was 27.4 years. 36.5% of residents were under the age of 18; 10.5% were between the ages of 18 and 24; 23.7% were from 25 to 44; 21.6% were from 45 to 64; and 7.6% were 65 years of age or older. The gender makeup of the city was 53.0% male and 47.0% female.

2000 census
As of the census of 2000, there were 323 people, 115 households, and 83 families residing in the city. The racial makeup of the city was 79.88% White, 0.62% African American, 0.93% Native American, 15.17% from other races, and 3.41% from two or more races. Hispanic or Latino of any race were 26.01% of the population.

There were 115 households, out of which 40.9% had children under the age of 18 living with them, 59.1% were married couples living together, 7.0% had a female householder with no husband present, and 27.8% were non-families. 22.6% of all households were made up of individuals, and 13.9% had someone living alone who was 65 years of age or older.  The average household size was 2.81 and the average family size was 3.36.

In the city, the population was spread out, with 32.5% under the age of 18, 12.7% from 18 to 24, 30.0% from 25 to 44, 11.8% from 45 to 64, and 13.0% who were 65 years of age or older.  The median age was 29 years. For every 100 females, there were 115.3 males.  For every 100 females age 18 and over, there were 109.6 males.

The median income for a household in the city was $31,667, and the median income for a family was $37,500. Males had a median income of $25,833 versus $19,583 for females. The per capita income for the city was $14,248.  About 17.1% of families and 16.4% of the population were below the poverty line, including 13.3% of those under age 18 and 18.9% of those age 65 or over.

Arts and culture
Hanley Falls is home to Minnesota's Machinery Museum.  MMM consists of five large buildings on a beautiful six-acre site.  The complex houses the state's largest collection of agricultural equipment and exhibits, recalling a century of farm life in stories and artifacts.  The museum is open May–September, 7 days a week.

References

Cities in Minnesota
Cities in Yellow Medicine County, Minnesota